Miss Universe Great Britain 2021 was the 13th edition of the Miss Universe Great Britain pageant. Emma Collingridge of Suffolk was crowned as the winner by outgoing titleholder Jeanette Akua of London. The pageant took place on 16 October 2021 at the Riverfront Arts Centre in Newport, Wales, United Kingdom. Collingridge represented Great Britain at Miss Universe 2021 finishing in the Top 16.

Final results

Official Delegates
The 29 finalist for Miss Universe Great Britain 2021 are:

Notes

Death of one of the finalists
On 13 April 2021, finalist Saarah Ahmed died at the age of 20 after fighting a rare disease that is a part of the Ehlers–Danlos syndromes.

References

External links
Official Website

2021
2021 in the United Kingdom
2021 in Wales
2021 beauty pageants